Jochen Nickel (born 10 April 1959) is a German actor. He has appeared in more than 160 films and TV series since 1988.

Life 
Nickel, a trained road builder, came to the stage in 1981 and was a member of the theater group Theaterpathologisches Institut in Hattingen and Lünen until 1987. He gave his television debut in 1988 in the Breakfast for Enemies by Norbert Kerkhey and Jochen Baier. In 1993 he was seen in Joseph Vilsmaiers anti-war film Stalingrad as Unteroffizier Rohleder. In the same year, Nickel had a supporting role in Schindler's List as Hauptscharführer Wilhelm Kunde. Numerous roles in film and television followed, where he often played the role of villains, robbers or striking Ruhrpott characters, but also comedic roles are not uncommon.

He was in a relationship with Sonja Kirchberger from 2001 to 2012 and lives in Witten.

Filmography

References

External links 

1959 births
Living people
German male film actors
German male television actors
20th-century German male actors
21st-century German male actors
People from Witten